Walter Atherton may refer to:

 Walter Atherton (architect) (1863–1945), American architect 
 Walter Atherton (footballer), English footballer